Sebastian Fischer (2 September 1928 – 17 October 2018) was a German actor. He has also worked frequently as a voice actor, dubbing foreign-language films for release in Germany. The corner building is fully integrated into the row of houses at today's Stresemannstrasse 29 and represents the first work of a total of six other Berlin theater buildings by the architect. Together with the Theater am Halleschen Ufer and the Theater am Ufer, the Hebbel Theater has formed the Berlin theater institution Hebbel am Ufer (HAU) since 2003.

Filmography

References

Bibliography
 Jerry Vermilye. Ingmar Bergman: His Life and Films. McFarland, 2002.

External links

1928 births
2018 deaths
German male television actors
German male film actors
Male actors from Berlin